The 900s BC is a decade which lasted from 909 BC to 900 BC.

Events and trends
 909 BC — Jeroboam, the first king of the northern Hebrew kingdom of Israel, dies and is succeeded by his son Nadab. A alternate of this date is 910 BC.
 c. 900 BC — the Adichanallur relics, from Tamilnadu Culture, India are 2,900 years old: The Archaeological Survey of India (ASI)
 c. 900 BC — the Villanovan culture emerges in northern Italy (Villanovan II).
 c. 900 BC - Foundation of Anuradhapura, Sri Lanka.
 900 BC — Kingdom of Kush.
 c. 900 BC — Greek Dark Ages end.
 c. 900 BC — Geometric period of vases starts in Ancient Greece.
 c. 900 BC — The inhabitants of the Aegean region establish small, distinct groups in valleys, on coastal plains and on islands, living in self-sufficient, close-knit communities but all speaking some form of the same language.
 c. 900 BC — San Lorenzo, the center of early Olmec culture, is destroyed, probably by migrating peoples from the north, and power passes to La Venta in Tabasco.
 c. 900 BC - La Venta starts to thrive.
 c. 900 BC - Colossal head (no. 4) from La Venta, Mexico, is made. Olmec culture. It is now kept at La Venta Park, Villahermosa, Tabasco, Mexico.
 c. 900 BC - 600 BC - Great Pyramid and ball court, La Venta, Mexico, is built. Olmec culture.

Significant people
 Jeroboam, the first king of the northern Hebrew kingdom of Israel, dies.
 Osorkon II, king of Egypt, is born (approximate date).
 Ahab, king of Israel, is born (approximate date).
 Jehoshaphat, king of Judah, is born (approximate date).

References